Kodjo Amegnisso Tossou (born 24 December 1966, in Sokode, Togo) is a Togolese politician and businessman. Tossou studied at Cheikh Anta Diop University, from which he received a degree in organizational management. After working for a number of pharmacies in Togo, he established a network of businesses in West Africa as a merchant of high-tech goods, selling brands from Europe.

In 1990, Tossou founded World Aid for Children, Inc. As founder and CEO, Tossou has spent much of his career supporting, educating (especially through vocational training), and representing the needs of disadvantaged children. In 1990, he founded the Association of the Struggle against Unemployment. Tossou returned to Togo in April 1992 and founded the Togolese Labour Party (Parti Liberal Togolais-PLT) the next month . He has led the party since its foundation.

References

John R.Heilbrunn, Togo: "The National Conference and Stalled Reform", in Political Reform in Francophone Africa (1997), ed. John F. Clark and David E. Gardinier, p. 231.
"Soldiers, Breaking Promise, Resume Place Siege in Togo", New York Times, 2 December 1991.
"Rebels Seize Togolese Premier", New York Times, 4 December 1991
"France Moves Troops to Block Coup", Associated Press (New York Times), 30 November 1991
Despite a Coup, Togo's Reform Prime Minister Clings to Post, Reuters (New York Times), 5 December 1991

Living people
1966 births
People from Sokodé
Togolese politicians
Togolese businesspeople
21st-century Togolese people